Khalfehlu (also Romanized as Khalfehlū, Khalaflū and, Khalfalū; also known as Khalaf-Ali) is a village in Sanjabad-e Shomali Rural District, in the Central District of Kowsar County, Ardabil Province, Iran. At the 2006 census, its population was 111, in 26 families.

References 

Towns and villages in Kowsar County